Policías, en el corazón de la calle or simply Policías is a Spanish police drama television series. Produced by Globomedia, its 6 seasons aired from January 2000 to January 2003 on Antena 3.

Premise 
The fiction was set around a police station in Madrid, focusing on the work and relationships of the police agents. Next to the police station there is a medical center where the police agents also interact with the medical workers.

Cast 
 Josep Maria Pou as Héctor Ferrer.
 Ana Fernández as Lucía Ramos.
  as Carlos Gándara Guzmán.
 Natalia Millán as Lola Ruiz.
 Toni Acosta as Vera Muñoz.
 Laura Pamplona as Marina Blasco.
 Pedro Casablanc as Manuel Klimov, "Ruso".
 Diego Martín as Jaime Castro.
 Daniel Guzmán as Rafa Trujillo.
 Lola Dueñas.
 Rodolfo Sancho.
 Melani Olivares as Laura.
 Nathalie Poza.
 .
 .
 Gloria Muñoz as Mercedes.

Production and release 
The series premiered on 11 January 2000. The broadcasting run ended on 16 January 2003, after 6 seasons and 83 episodes. 

Manuel Valdivia, César Rodríguez Blanco and Chus Vallejo were credited as executive producers. , Salvador Calvo, Manuel Valdivia, Jesús del Cerro and Sandra Gallego were among those directing the episodes, whereas Nacho Cabana, Chus Vallejo, J. M. Ruiz Córdoba, Beatriz G. Cruz and Verónica Viñé were part of the scriptwriting team.

Awards and nominations 

|-
| align = "center" rowspan = "3" | 2001 || rowspan = "3" | 10th Actors and Actresses Union Awards || Best Leading Performance (TV) || Josep Maria Pou ||  || rowspan = "3" | 
|-
| rowspan = "2" | Best Supporting Performance (TV) || Pedro Casablanc ||  
|-
| Lola Dueñas || 
|}

References 

2000 Spanish television series debuts
2003 Spanish television series endings
Spanish action television series
Spanish-language television shows
2000s Spanish drama television series
Spanish police procedural television series
Antena 3 (Spanish TV channel) network series
2000s police procedural television series
Television shows set in Madrid